Math Rabbit is a 1986 video game that serves as a spin-off to the Reader Rabbit edutainment series. It was made by The Learning Company for MS-DOS and Apple II. A Deluxe version was released in 1993 for MS-DOS, Macintosh, and Windows 3.x. Then in 1997, the game was remade for Windows and Macintosh as Reader Rabbit's Math 1. The final remake for Windows and Macintosh in 1998 is Reader Rabbit's Math Ages 4-6, with a personalized version released in 1999.

Gameplay
The game takes place in a circus and teaches addition, subtraction, and counting in four different games, each of which with multiple difficulty settings. The game is for ages 4–7. The four games are:

 Clown's Counting Games - the player is required to count with a number as a guide to pitch the tone of the musical instrument.
 Tightrope Game - the player has to help Reader Rabbit match a picture of objects with a displaying number and discard the pictures that don't match.
 Circus Train Game - the player has complete a sequence of numbers each being added to a particular number. 
 Mystery Matching Game - the player has to match turn over cards and find matching pictures of items and corresponding numbers.

Since Math Rabbit Deluxe, the games were retitled "Calliope Counting Game", "Tightrope Show", "Sea Lion Show", and "Balloon Matching Game", respectively, but the game objectives and rules remained the same.

Development

The game was originally designed by Teri Perl and programmed by Aaron Weiss. Upon the release of the Deluxe edition, Bill Dinsmore, The Learning Company president and chief executive officer, said: "With the release of Reader Rabbit 1 and Math Rabbit for Windows, we now offer five Windows educational software products that help to develop important learning skills".

The original art of Math Rabbit was done by Analee Nunan. For Math Rabbit Deluxe 256 color VGA graphics were applied. The original music and sound composition were done by Teri Perl and Aaron Weiss. For Math Rabbit Deluxe, Adlib soundtracks were composed.

The activities in the game helped young users to understand number relationships. The game also came with a scope and sequence guide as well as a lab pack.

Reception

Critical reception

The program received highly positive reviews from critics. In particular, the Chicago Sun-Times was a champion of Math Blaster, praising and recommending it in no less than seven separate articles.

The Los Angeles Times said the game was "sweet", though negatively compared it to Millie's Math House. FOGG praised the easy-to-use gaming interface, and The Washington Post thought it was "entertaining" while incorporating valuable lessons into "colorfully fun graphics". Superkids described the game as "excellent" and said it was a great first introduction to educational video gaming for the target audience. Chicago Sun-Times recommended the "outstanding" software for the 1989 holiday season and noted it was among the "high-quality educational software sold", also saying in other article that it was one of the best educational titles for offering a "solid instructional model" that teaching kids the fundamentals of mathematics through "smoothly" integrating the gaming and learning without "bogging them down in mindless mathematical trivia", and example being the teaching of geometry at a very early age. Computer Shopper said the product was "remarkably good software", and positively compared its depth and carde gameplay to Power Rangers ZEO PowerActive. PC Mag said the game was the superior choice over Stickybear Numbers and Math and Me due to its customization options. Computer Gaming World in 1994 stated that "Math Rabbit is very easy to use, and accommodates different learning styles. It's a fun program kids can really count on".

Commercial performance
It was the 7th most popular in the education category sold across 11 Software Etc. stores in the Washington area in the week ending on August 23, 1995.

References

External links
 
 

1986 video games
1993 video games
1997 video games
1998 video games
Children's educational video games
The Learning Company games
Reader Rabbit
DOS games
Windows games
Apple II games
Video game remakes
Classic Mac OS games
Video games about rabbits and hares
Video games developed in the United States
Single-player video games